Wayne Francis Earl Bell (18 April 1944 – 3 May 1994) was a New Zealand-born actor who achieved international stardom playing the part of original character Max Ramsay in the early years of the popular Australian soap opera, Neighbours. During his career he also acted in Australian serials The Sullivans and Sons and Daughters. He appeared in 15 films from 1976 until his death.

Career in Neighbours
His character Max Ramsay, was a key character for the show's first year. Soon after the serial switched from the Seven Network to Channel Ten in early 1986, Bell abruptly left the show. To accommodate this loss, the new character of Max's brother Tom was hastily introduced. In the story Tom arrived to take the reins of Max's plumbing business while Max was away; behind the scenes the scriptwriters went through the scripts replacing "Max" with "Tom", with Tom speaking the dialogue written for Max.

Other roles
Prior to Neighbours, Bell had minor roles in The Sullivans and Sons and Daughters.

In 1985 Bell played the role of Major-General Howard 'Pompey' Elliott in the critically acclaimed Australian mini-series Anzacs. Also starring in the series were Paul Hogan, Andrew Clarke, Jon Blake, Megan Williams, Tony Bonner, Bill Kerr, Ilona Rodgers, Robert Coleby and David Bradshaw

Death
On 3 May 1994, Bell was found dead after falling from a building in Auckland, New Zealand. The city's police released a statement stating that there were no suspicious circumstances regarding his death. He was buried at Purewa Cemetery. His agent Graham Dunster later revealed that Bell had been hospitalised with depression prior to his death.

Filmography
The Sullivans (TV series 1976)
Sons and Daughters (TV series 1982)
Who Killed Baby Azaria? (TV movie 1983)
Five Mile Creek (TV series 1983)
Anzacs (TV mini-series 1985)
Glass Babies (Miniseries) (TV mini-series 1985)
Rubbery Figures (TV series 1986)
Neighbours (TV series 1985–1986) (191 episodes)
Bushfire Moon (TV movie 1987)
 Against the Innocent (1989)
The End of the Golden Weather (1991)
Absent Without Leave (1992)
Homeward Bound (TV series) (TV series 1992)
Alexander Graham Bell: The Sound and the Silence (TV movie 1992)
Hercules: The Legendary Journeys – Hercules and the Lost Kingdom (TV movie 1994)
Mrs. Piggle-Wiggle (TV series 1994)

References

External links
 

1944 births
1994 deaths
Australian male television actors
Suicides by jumping in New Zealand
British male television actors
Burials at Purewa Cemetery
20th-century Australian male actors
20th-century British male actors
1994 suicides